The 2002 Minnesota gubernatorial election took place on November 5, 2002 for the post of Governor of Minnesota. Republican candidate Tim Pawlenty defeated Democratic candidate Roger Moe and Independence Party of Minnesota candidate Tim Penny. Due to personal reasons regarding the health of his spouse, incumbent Governor Jesse Ventura chose not to seek re-election. Pawlenty comfortably won the election, which was attributed in part to Moe's uninspired campaign, with Moe being dubbed a "cautious dullard" four years later by the City Pages.

Republican primary

Candidate 
Tim Pawlenty, Minnesota House of Representatives and Majority Leader
Leslie Davis, former Minneapolis mayoral candidate in 1994

Results

DFL primary 
In May 2002, the DFL formally endorsed Moe over rival Judi Dutcher, the Minnesota State Auditor. Becky Lourey, a member of the Minnesota Senate, was also a contender before dropping out.

Candidate 
Roger Moe, Member of the Minnesota Senate and Majority Leader
Oloveuse S. "Ole" Savior, artist and perennial candidate.

Results

General election

Predictions

Results

References

See also
List of Minnesota gubernatorial elections

Minnesota
2002
Gubernatorial